The Thracian tomb "Helvetia" mound near Shipka, Bulgaria, was built in the middle of the 4th century BC.

Construction 

The walls of the tomb's entrance corridor are made of stone. After this corridor an antechamber is followed by a rectangular chamber with a unique covered ceiling. The ceiling is bent by the walls of both rooms, crossed by a horizontal zone. This marks the transition from the double-pitched, to the semi-cylindrical, ceiling of chambers in Thracian architecture. The floor of the tomb is plastered, and the walls of the antechamber and the other rooms were covered with a coating. Through the horizontal and vertical grooves, they were covered by large marble blocks. The chamber had a stone door that locked from the inside. Opposite the entrance, a ritual stone bed was located in the room. The last funeral that occurred in the antechamber is believed to be that of a horse.

References 

 Проблеми и изследвания на тракийската култура, том І - V

See also 
Thracian tomb of Aleksandrovo
Thracian tomb of Cotys I
Thracian tomb Golyama Arsenalka
Thracian tomb Griffins
Thracian Tomb of Kazanlak
Thracian tomb Ostrusha
Thracian tomb of Seuthes III
Thracian tomb Shushmanets
Thracian Tomb of Sveshtari
Valley of the Thracian Rulers
Roman Tomb (Silistra)

Tombs in Bulgaria
Thracian sites
History of Stara Zagora Province